Saklovo (Haqlaw) is a rural locality (a selo) in Sauzbashevsky Selsoviet, Krasnokamsky District, Bashkortostan, Russia. The population was 388 as of 2010. There are 9 streets.

Geography 
Saklovo is located 40 km southwest of Nikolo-Beryozovka (the district's administrative centre) by road. Sauzbash is the nearest rural locality.

References 

Rural localities in Krasnokamsky District
Ufa Governorate